Monte Antico is a village in Tuscany, central Italy, administratively a frazione of the comune of Civitella Paganico, province of Grosseto, in the area of the Ombrone Valley. At the time of the 2001 census its population amounted to 33.

Geography 
Monte Antico is about 35 km from Grosseto and 18 km from Civitella Marittima, and it is situated where river Ombrone and river Orcia meet.

It is composed by two hamlets, Monte Antico Alto, where it is situated the ancient castle, and Monte Antico Scalo, the modern neighbourhood near to the train station.

Main sights 
 Castle of Monte Antico, ancient building built in the 11th century as property of the Ardengheschi family.
 San Tommaso Apostolo, of uncertain origins, situated next to the castle, it was restructured in the 20th century in Neo-Romanesque style.
 San Tommaso, modern parish church built in 1961, it is situated near the train station in Monte Antico Scalo.
 Pieve di San Giovanni Battista in Ancaiano, destroyed.

Transport 
The village is served by its own station on the Grosseto-Siena railway.

References

Bibliography 
 Aldo Mazzolai, Guida della Maremma. Percorsi tra arte e natura, Le Lettere, Florence, 1997.

See also 
 Casale di Pari
 Civitella Marittima
 Dogana, Civitella Paganico
 Paganico
 Pari, Civitella Paganico

Frazioni of Civitella Paganico